Nikora "Niko" Walters is a New Zealand contemporary soul and R&B musician. Debuting in 2019, Walters is best known for the "Not My Neighbour" (2020), which was certified double platinum and was one of the top singles of 2021 in New Zealand. Walters released his debut album Escape in 2020, followed by White Flag Waves in 2022.

Biography

Walters grew up in Auckland. Of Māori descent, he has whakapapa to the Northland tribes of Te Aupōuri, Te Rarawa and Ngāpuhi. He learnt guitar socially from family members, never receiving formal lessons, and learnt to produce songs using a pirated copy of audio software FruityLoops. In high school, Walters took part in kapa haka and Samoan cultural groups.

He first considered pursuing music while on an OE (working holiday) in London. While there, Walters spent a week writing and recording a mixtape, which gained traction on SoundCloud. On returning to New Zealand, he signed with Universal Music New Zealand in early 2019.

Walters released his first singles, "Moving On" and "Together" in mid-2019, and toured New Zealand as an opening act for Stan Walker. In 2020, Walters was an opening act for New Zealand band Six60's performance at Western Springs Stadium, and later that year released his debut album Escape. A single from the album, "Not My Neighbour", was a hit in New Zealand, becoming one of the New Zealand top 50 singles of 2021. In 2021, the song was re-released as a single, in a remixed version featuring American singer Kiana Ledé. Walters opened for Six60 a second time in 2021, to their Eden Park performance in front of a crowd of 50,000 people.

In 2022, Walters released his second album White Flag Waves.

Personal life 

Walters' older brother is the frontman of New Zealand band Six60, Matiu Walters.

Discography

Studio albums

Singles

Promotional singles

Notes

References

21st-century New Zealand male singers
Living people
Māori-language singers
Musicians from Auckland
New Zealand male singer-songwriters
Ngāpuhi people
Te Aupōuri people
Te Rarawa people
Date of birth missing (living people)
Year of birth missing (living people)